Abraham ben Mordecai Farissol (Avraham ben Mordekhai Faritzol, ;  – 1525 or 1526) was a Jewish-Italian geographer, cosmographer, scribe, and polemicist. He was the first Hebrew writer to deal in detail with the newly-discovered Americas.

Biography
Abraham ben Mordecai Farissol was born in Avignon, where his family had lived for at least a century. Soon after 1468 Farissol went to Mantua, where he worked for Judah ben Yehiel Messer Leon as a scribe. He went to Ferrara in 1473, where he acted as hazzan in the synagogue, and occupied himself besides in the copying of manuscripts.

Farissol immersed himself in Renaissance life revolving around the enlightened court of Ercole d'Este I, Duke of Ferrara. He was also attendant at the court of Lorenzo de' Medici, where his interest in traveller's tales and discovery was whetted.

Work

Women's prayer books

In 1471 and 1480 Farrisol published two women's prayer books, notable for replacing the traditional prayer in the Birkot hashachar recited by women, "Blessed are You, Lord our God, Master of Universe for creating me according to Your Will," with "Blessed are You Lord our God, Master of the Universe, for You made me a woman and not a man". The 1480 book was donated to the National Library of Israel in 1973.

Biblical commentary and translations
Abraham Farissol wrote a short commentary to the Torah under the title of Pirḥe Shoshannim, and later published a commentary to Job, which includes a study on the location of the Land of Uz (in Biblia Rabbinica, Venice, 1518).

In 1525 Farissol wrote a commentary to Ecclesiastes. He also translated into Hebrew Aristotle's Logic and the compendium of Porphyry. Some sermons of Farissol's, and a number of letters which he wrote in 1468 and 1474 to several of his contemporaries, are also extant.

Magen Avraham
Farissol wrote a polemical work under the title of Magen Avraham, or Vikkuaḥ ha-Dat, in three parts, the second against Christianity, the third against Islam. He was induced to write this work by the fact that he was chosen to represent Judaism at the court of d'Este in a disputation with two Dominican monks. By order of the duke he also made a résumé in Italian of the Hebrew text, so that his antagonists might understand his position. The work was largely based on Simeon ben Zemah Duran's Keshet u-Magen.

Iggeret Orḥot 'Olam

The most important of his writings is the Iggeret Orḥot 'Olam (Ferrara, 1524; Venice, 1587), a cosmographic and geographic work based upon original research as well as the works of Christian and Arab geographers, especially Bergomas' , Amerigo's , and Fracanzano da Montalboddo's . Each of the treatise's thirty chapters deals with a certain geographical area or subject, and many cosmological and historical matters are also treated. The book contains accounts of the newly discovered parts of the world, the new Portuguese sea route to India, the Ten Tribes, David Reuveni, and the condition of the Jews in various parts of the world. It includes descriptions of the Amerindians, emphasizing their sexual practices, social organization, lack of property, health, the richness of their wildlife, and their wealth in gems and metals. Farissol also used a combination of textual evidence with geographic and climatic evidence to determine the location of the Garden of Eden. The Iggeret was translated into Latin by Bodleian librarian Thomas Hyde under the title of "" (Oxford, 1691).

References

External links 

 
 
 

1451 births
1525 deaths
1526 deaths
15th-century geographers
16th-century geographers
15th-century Italian Jews
16th-century Italian Jews
French geographers
Italian geographers
Italian Renaissance writers
Jewish scribes (soferim)
Latin–Hebrew translators
15th-century French Jews
Medieval Jewish scholars
Writers from Avignon
Scientists from Ferrara
Provençal Jews